David B. Sapunjis (born September 7, 1967 in Toronto, Ontario) is a former wide receiver for the Calgary Stampeders from 1990-1997. Sapunjis won the CFL's Most Outstanding Canadian Award two times and was the Grey Cup Most Valuable Canadian three times (and is the only player to win the latter award in back-to-back years). He played college football at the University of Western Ontario where he was also a member of The Kappa Alpha Society.  During his playing career, Sapunjis was nicknamed "The Sponge".

Currently, Sapunjis is the president of Reliance Metals Canada Limited.

References

External links
One-on-one with Dave Sapunjis

1967 births
Living people
Calgary Stampeders players
Canadian Football League Most Outstanding Canadian Award winners
Canadian football wide receivers
Canadian football people from Toronto
Players of Canadian football from Ontario
Western Mustangs football players